Raymond "Ray" Smith (born 6 December 1979 in Brisbane) is an Australian professional darts player who currently plays in both Professional Darts Corporation (PDC) and World Darts Federation (WDF) events.

Darts career

BDO
In 2015, Smith won the Central Coast Australian Classic, New South Wales Open and North Queensland Classic. In 2016 he won the Sunshine State Classic and the North Queensland Classic for the second time. He reached the Last 32 of the 2016 World Masters. He qualified for the 2017 BDO World Darts Championship, beating Davy Van Baelen in the preliminary round before losing to Geert De Vos.

PDC
Smith competed on the Dartplayers Australia tour in 2018; winning five events and topping the rankings to qualify for the 2019 PDC World Darts Championship. He also competed in two Australia-held events on the 2018 World Series of Darts, the Melbourne Darts Masters where he lost in the first round to Michael van Gerwen, and the 2018 Brisbane Darts Masters where he beat Michael Smith before being knocked out by Peter Wright.
Raymond Smith qualified for the 2022 PDC World Darts Championship and reached the last 16 losing to Mervyn King 4-3. Beating Jamie Hughes, Devon Petersen & Fiorian Hempel

On 4th February 2023. Raymond Smith won the 2nd edition of the Modus Super Series beating Matt Clark in the final in a last leg thriller

Personal life
Raymond has a son, Ky Smith who is also an Australian professional darts player. In the 2022 PDC World Darts Championship, they became the first father-son duo to compete at a World Championship.

World Championship results

BDO
 2017: First round (lost to Geert De Vos 0–3)

PDC
 2019: First round (lost to Alan Tabern 2–3)
 2022: Fourth round (lost to Mervyn King 3–4)
 2023: First round (lost to Karel Sedláček 0–3)

References

External links
 Profile and stats on Darts Database

Living people
Australian darts players
British Darts Organisation players
Professional Darts Corporation associate players
1979 births
Sportspeople from Brisbane